John Rawlinson may refer to:

John Rawlinson (priest) (1576–1631), English churchman and academic
John Rawlinson (politician) (1860–1926), England footballer and Member of Parliament
John Rawlinson (cricketer, born 1867) (1867–1945), English cricketer
Spike Rawlings (John Anderson Rawlinson, 1944–2006), English footballer turned TV entertainer
John Rawlinson (cricketer, born 1959), English cricketer and artist